Calvin J. Collier (January 6, 1942 – October 6, 2020) was a former chair of the Federal Trade Commission, having been appointed to that position by President Gerald Ford and served from March 25, 1976 to April 20, 1977.

Born in Cicero, Illinois, his father, Harold R. Collier, served in the United States Congress. Collier received a B.A. from Grinnell College in 1964, and an LL.B. from Duke University School of Law in 1967, where he served on the law review. He was a law clerk for Judge Harold Leventhal of the United States Court of Appeals for the District of Columbia Circuit, and served as the director of urban program coordination for the United States Department of Housing and Urban Development before his appointment to the FTC. Among other notable accomplishments after he left the Commission, Collier served on the transition team for Ronald Reagan in 1980 and 1984, and later joined Kraft Foods Inc. as Senior Vice President, General Counsel, and Secretary until his retirement. He remained active in several educational, civic, and charitable organizations. In 2006, Collier received the Miles W. Kirkpatrick Award, awarded to individuals who have made "lasting and significant contributions to the FTC".

References

1942 births
Living people
People from Cicero, Illinois
Grinnell College alumni
Duke University School of Law alumni
Federal Trade Commission personnel